Wilfred is a sitcom that aired from June 23, 2011 to August 13, 2014 for a total of four seasons. Based on the Australian SBS One series of the same name, it stars Elijah Wood and series co-creator Jason Gann, reprising his role of the eponymous dog. The series was adapted for the American television channel FX by Family Guy veteran David Zuckerman, and moved to FXX for its fourth and final season.

Plot
The series follows Ryan, a depressed ex-lawyer who is the only one able to see Jenna's (his neighbor) pet dog (Wilfred) as a man in a dog suit. Throughout the show, Ryan and Wilfred become close, spending nearly every day together. Wilfred is vulgar, a bad influence, pushy, and often mean. Wilfred pressures Ryan to learn life lessons, reveal past memories, admit shortcomings, and do things he otherwise would not do through strange and sometimes abusive methods.

Cast

Main
 Elijah Wood as Ryan Newman; a timid ex-shark lawyer. He begins the series with harsh depression and suicidal tendencies. He continues to be clingy and dependent with Wilfred, and harbors an unrequited love for Jenna. Ryan often does things that Wilfred encourages him to do.
 Jason Gann as Wilfred Fazio Mueller; a foul mouthed and blunt Australian accented shepherd dog that Ryan sees as a man in a dog suit but everyone else sees as a real dog, loves his owner Jenna, and is cocky and jealous of well-behaved dogs. He has a love of stuffed animals, in particular Bear & Raffi. Bear is his codependent giant stuffed teddy bear in Ryan's basement. Raffi is a stuffed giraffe that Wilfred courts by conning Ryan into whoring himself to a desperate executive woman whose car he hit. As the series progresses, Wilfred is often torn between his love for Bear and his lust for other stuffed animals. 
 Fiona Gubelmann as Jenna Mueller. Ryan's neighbor and love interest, she is a charming TV personality who sometimes gets caught in the cross hairs of Wilfred and Ryan's shenanigans. She is constantly trying to make things work out with her on-again-off-again beau Drew.
 Dorian Brown as Kristen Newman; Ryan's sister, an OB/GYN, single mom, seemingly dependent on Ryan, as pointed out by Wilfred. She is hostile and rude towards people, especially Ryan. She gets pregnant and has a baby named Joffrey in the second season.

Recurring
 Chris Klein as Drew, Jenna’s easygoing and lighthearted but competitive boyfriend and later husband. Wilfred despises him despite his good relationship with Ryan.
 Gerry Bednob as Mr. Patel (season 1; guest season 3), Ryan’s Indian neighbor who is rude.
 J. P. Manoux as Leo (season 1), Kristen’s obnoxious and estranged husband who disapproves of her job as a Doctor who leaves her when she tells him of her affair with Dr. Ramos.
 Rodney To as Dr. Bangachon
 Rob Riggle as Kevin (season 2), Ryan’s friendly and easygoing co-worker.
 Steven Weber as Jeremy (season 2), Ryan’s boss at his new job who kills himself after their secrets are stolen by a rival company.
 Harriet Sansom Harris as Lonnie Goldsmith (season 4)

Episodes

The show follows a young man named Ryan (Elijah Wood) and his neighbor's dog Wilfred (Jason Gann). In the opening episode, Ryan concocts a drug cocktail to commit suicide. After this failed attempt, Ryan's neighbor, Jenna (Fiona Gubelmann), knocks on his door to ask him to look after Wilfred, whom Ryan sees and hears as a man in a dog costume.

Production

Development
Wilfred is based on the critically acclaimed Australian series of the same name and was adapted for FX by Family Guy veteran David Zuckerman. Wilfred is produced by FX Productions while the executive producers include: Zuckerman; Rich and Paul Frank; Jeff Kwatinetz; and Joe and Ken Connor from the original Australian series. Wilfred co-creator Jason Gann and Randall Einhorn serve as co-executive producers. Einhorn directed 10 episodes of the first season and Victor Nelli, Jr. directed three. The pilot episode was filmed in summer 2010, written by Zuckerman, and directed by Einhorn.

Unlike the Australian version—which concentrated equally on Wilfred, his owner, and her boyfriend—the American version is presented as a buddy comedy between Wilfred and Ryan.

Adapting the Australian series
There was interest in continuing the series on SBS, including talk about a possible film. However, Renegade Film, the company that produced the original Australian series, was unable to sell it in its original version to any other countries. Gann left to create an entirely new series for the US that used the format of the original and additional Australian seasons were not pursued.
Gann was initially hesitant to make a US series stating, "I had no interest in making the same show again, just surrounded by people with different accents." However, the show in the US differed greatly from the original series.

When the show moved to the US, head writer and show creator Jason Gann took a more advisory role in the writers room, only writing six episodes of the show's four season run. Gann has noted that writing the US version was more taxing than writing the Australian version. His pitches often got rejected and ultimately in the transition he gave up a lot of creative control.  This resulted in departing from the Australian series in several ways.

When David Zuckerman took over the series he expressed that the show's lack of international appeal was due to a lack of clear rules that the fantasy elements of the show could follow. He made it a priority to set and follow certain rules in the new series. 
In reworking the character of Wilfred and his relationship with Ryan for an American audience, Gann used the film My Bodyguard as a reference point. The show took on a much more lighthearted and hopeful tone as the original series was often cited as being extremely cynical. 
 
The show was pitched to Gann as a different vehicle for the same character he played in the Australian version. Because the character was so crude, and because he'd have to be in a dog suit all the time, Gann originally didn’t want to play Wilfred. However, he feels the character is actually very different from the Australian version having a lot more sides and overall "more fun."

On more than one occasion Gann has suggested that part of the reason the show had poor ratings in the US was because it got bogged down in mythology and at times made comedy secondary stating, "Season Three, we really tried to steer it back closer to where we were Season One, and make it really comedically satisfying. I really felt we achieved that, but it wasn’t enough, I guess."

After the close of the final season in the US, Gann has considered going back and doing a third Australian season.

Casting
The casting of Elijah Wood as Ryan was announced on June 29, 2010. Ryan is described as "an introverted and troubled young man struggling unsuccessfully to make his way in the world until he forms a unique friendship with Wilfred, his neighbor's canine pet." Series co-creator Jason Gann also reprises his role of the eponymous dog Wilfred, a character described by Zuckerman as being a mixed breed dog who is "part Labrador Retriever and part Russell Crowe on a bender". Fiona Gubelmann stars as Jenna, Wilfred's owner and Ryan's next-door neighbor, who works as a local news producer. Dorian Brown was then cast as Kristen, Ryan's controlling and condescending older sister.

Filming
The first season of Wilfred was shot using a DSLR, the Canon 7D, using a three camera setup. The following seasons were shot with a Nikon D800.

Reception
Critical reception of the US adaptation of Wilfred was comparable to that of the original Australian series, with generally positive reviews. Review aggregation website Metacritic gives season 1 of the series an average score of 67 out of 100 based on reviews from 25 critics. Curt Wagner, writing in Redeye (The Chicago Tribune), said "Stuffed with absurd situations and piles of bad taste, Wilfred is the strangest new show on TV. And the funniest." David Wiegand, in the San Francisco Chronicle, wrote, "Wilfred works on many levels, something that may not become apparent until after you stop laughing."

Some of the less positive reviews included Mike Hale, who wrote in The New York Times: "Some shows aspire to cult status; this one goes straight there, practically bypassing the need to be broadcast at all," but concluded: "Gann's bits of doggie business ... are reliably humorous, but beyond that the show doesn’t offer a lot of bark or bite." Tom Gliatto of People Magazine also gave a less positive review, calling the show "The Odd Couple redefined by psychosis and whimsy. I'm not wagging my tail."

The series premiere hit a positive note with viewers as it became the highest-ranking debut sitcom ever for FX Networks. It continued to remain in the top 10 shows for Thursday night cable television throughout the first season. It was picked up for a second season on August 6, 2011. The second season aired from June 21 to September 20, 2012. On October 31, 2012, Wilfred was renewed for Season 3, which aired from June 20 to September 5, 2013. On October 2, Wilfred was renewed for a fourth and final season, which aired from June 25 to August 13, 2014.

Possible film
In an October 2013 interview, Jason Gann noted that a possible film is out of his hands, but if fans wanted it, he could see the show coming back in a streaming capacity much like Arrested Development. In a June 2014 interview, Gann stated that he and Elijah Wood would be interested in a Wilfred film "if the story is there…"

International broadcast
Australia – Premiered on Eleven, June 28, 2011, in the Tuesday 9:30 timeslot, and currently repeated on The Comedy Channel in the Monday 9pm slot. Season 3 screened on Eleven on Sundays at 10.30pm.
Canada – Premiered on October 31, 2011, in the Thursday 10 pm timeslot, as an anchor title for the launch of the FX Canada network.
Philippines – Premiered on Jack TV, March 20, 2012, in the 9.00 pm timeslot.
United Kingdom – Premiered on BBC Three, August 16, 2011, in the 10.30 pm timeslot. Season 2 premiered on August 16, 2012, during the 10 pm timeslot, remaining on BBC Three.
Israel – Premiered on yes Oh HD, April 29, 2012, in the 9.30 pm timeslot.
Russia – Premiered on 2×2, August 27, 2012.
Portugal – Premiered on FX, February 13, 2012.
Germany – Premiered on ProSieben Fun, February 24, 2013

Russian adaptation
After winning awards at MIPCOM in 2013, Renegade films sold the Wilfred concept to Russian producers. A third version is being created for Russian networks retitled Charlie.

References

External links

 

 
2010s American black comedy television series
2010s American sitcoms
2010s American surreal comedy television series
2011 American television series debuts
2014 American television series endings
American television series based on Australian television series
English-language television shows
Existentialist television series
FX Networks original programming
FXX original programming
Television about mental health
Television series by 20th Century Fox Television
Television shows about dogs
Television shows set in Los Angeles